"Shine On (Shine All Your Sweet Love on Me)" is a song written by Johnny MacRae and Bob Morrison, and recorded by American country music artist George Jones.  It was released in January 1983 as the first single from his album Shine On. The song peaked at number 3 on the Billboard Hot Country Singles chart. "Shine On" was Jones' sixth Top 10 solo hit in less than three years. The song also displayed some of the pop elements that producer Billy Sherrill would introduce into George's sound over the course of his next few albums.

Chart performance

References 

1983 singles
George Jones songs
Epic Records singles
Song recordings produced by Billy Sherrill
Songs written by Bob Morrison (songwriter)
Songs written by Johnny MacRae
1983 songs